A constitutional referendum was held in the Central African Republic on 5 December 2004. The new constitution would change the system of government from presidential to semi-presidential, as well as putting a limit of two terms on the President. It was approved by 91.37% of voters with a 77.1% turnout.

Results

References

2004 referendums
2004 in the Central African Republic
2004
Constitutional referendums
2004